The  was an army of the Imperial Japanese Army during the final days of World War II.

History
The Japanese 58th Army was formed on April 7, 1945, under the Japanese 17th Area Army as part of the last desperate defense effort by the Empire of Japan to deter possible landings of Allied forces in Jejudo (Saishuto) island during Operation Downfall.  The Japanese 58th Army consisted mostly of poorly trained reservists, conscripted students and home guard militia. It was demobilized at the surrender of Japan on August 15, 1945, without having seen combat.

List of Commanders

Commanding officer

Chief of Staff

References

External links

58
Military units and formations established in 1945
Military units and formations disestablished in 1945